The Dutch Olympic Committee*Dutch Sports Federation, generally abbreviated NOC*NSF, is the overall coordinating Dutch sports organisation that also functions as the Dutch National Olympic Committee and National Paralympic Committee. NOC*NSF, based at the National Sports Centre Papendal in Arnhem,  is the umbrella organisation for sports in the Netherlands, representing more than 23,000 sports clubs and 5,2 million Dutch people involved in sports.

IOC members

Team NL
Team NL is the sports team project with the goal of closer association of athletes and fans. It was created joined forces 29 sports associations and NOC*NSF that represents the Dutch athletes 365 days a year at an international top level at European Championships, World Championships and Olympic and Paralympic Games.

See also
 Netherlands at the Olympics
 Netherlands at the Paralympics

References

External links
 NOC*NSF website
 Team NL website

Netherlands
Netherlands at the Olympics
 
Sport in the Netherlands
1912 establishments in the Netherlands

Sports organizations established in 1912